The Cyprus national under-21 football team is the national under-21 football team for Cyprus and like the senior team, is controlled by the Cyprus Football Association.

The team drew their first official match 0–0 in 1978 at home to Spain in a qualifying match for the 1980 UEFA European Under-21 Football Championship. They then drew 0–0 with the trophy holders Yugoslavia, also at home. They lost both away games though. And finished last in the group of three teams, with two points from four games, and so did not qualify for the Finals.

In the qualifying stages for the 1982 UEFA European Under-21 Football Championship, Cyprus made history when they defeated France 2–1 in Cyprus as it was the countries first ever official victory at National or Under-21 football level. The scorer of the Cypriot goals was Islington born Kikis Kyriacou of Olympiakos Nicosia whose promising career was brought to a premature end following a horrific leg injury.

In the qualifying stages for the 1992 UEFA European Under-21 Football Championship, the team beat Greece 1-0 and drew 1–1 with Sweden who went on to reach the Final. Cyprus finished last in their qualifying group with three points, the same number as Greece.

The Under 21 team made gradual improvements and in September 1999, in a qualifying match for the 2000 UEFA European Under-21 Football Championship, drew 1–1 in Spain, the eventual winners of the competition. The team finished fourth out of five teams in their qualifying group, ahead of Austria.

The qualifying stages for the 2004 UEFA European Under-21 Football Championship provided the greatest achievement for the Cyprus under-21 national team to date, when they finished second in Qualification Group One, with 15 points, winning five of their eight matches. France won the group with 22 points, seven points ahead of Cyprus.

In 2004, Cyprus joined the European Union, and Cypriot teams took advantage of the Bosman rule bringing in foreign players. This has meant that young Cypriot players are now not as common in the Cypriot First Division and is therefore also having an adverse effect on the under-21 national team.

European Championship record Under-21

UEFA U-21 Euro 2019 qualification

Friendly matches

Coaching staff

Current squad 
 The following players were called up for the friendly matches.
 Match dates: 17 and 20 November 2022
 Opposition:  and 
 Caps and goals correct as of:''' 24 September 2022, after the match against

See also
 Cyprus national football team
 Cyprus national under-19 football team
 Cyprus national under-17 football team
 UEFA European Under-21 Championship

References

External links
 CFA.COM.CY U21 - Cyprus Football Association Official Page
 UEFA.COM - Cyprus U21 National Team

European national under-21 association football teams
under-21